Georgia and Russia have played 24 times, out of which Georgia has won 22 matches and Russia won a single match, 1 match ended in a draw.

They regularly play each other in the Rugby Europe Championship (previously named European Nations Cup). The first match was played in Poland on May 25 1993 that Russia won 15–9. 

Tensions between Georgia and Russia remained high after the war in August 2008, resulting in the scheduling of head-to-head rugby matches on neutral soil during 2009 and 2010.

Summary

Overall
Georgia and Russia have played each other at the Rugby Europe Championship, Rugby World Cup qualification and the 1996–97 FIRA Tournament.

Records
Note: Date shown in brackets indicates when the record was or last set.

Results

References

Georgia national rugby union team matches
Russia national rugby union team matches
Georgia (country)–Russia relations